Meenkara Dam is an embankment or earthen dam built on the banks of the river Gayatripuzha, a tributary of the river Bharathapuzha, at Muthalamada in the Muthalamada Grama Panchayat near Kollengode in the Palakkad district of Kerala with masonry spillway sections. It is part of the Gayatri Irrigation Project.  The project was started in 1956 and partially commissioned in 1960. The project was fully completed in 1964.  The irrigation scheme has been prepared for agriculture and drinking water in Palakkad district. Farms in Chittoor, Nemmara, Alathur in Palakkad district and Vadakkancherry in Thrissur district will benefit from this irrigation scheme.

Description
The Dam is an earthen dam with total length of   including  length masonry in spillway section.(Length of earthen dam  is 934 m and the length of masonry dam  is 30 m)  The height of masonry dam is 18.9 m and 2 numbers of spillway gates of size 12.19 m x 4.26 m. Top width of the dam is 7 meters. 

The canal system consists of two main canals and branch canals. There is a sluice for drawing the water. Size of canal sluice is 1.52 m x 1.83 m. Left bank canal which takes off from the sluice has a length of 20.5 km and it receives water from the Chulliyar reservoir also, as it is connected by a leading channel from the Chulliyar dam. The sill level of canal sluice and river sluice is +143.64 m. The water for the right canal is let down to the river from the Meenkara reservoir and is picked up by a small dam which is 5.5 km downstream.

Location and purpose 
The Meenkara dam Project is located in the Muthalamada village in Palakkad District of Kerala State. Location of the Dam is Latitude 76 ° 48’E Longitude 10 °38’N. The nearest towns are Kollangode in Kerala and Pollachi in Tamil Nadu. Meenkara Dam is an earthen dam with masonry spillway section and meets water requirement of an ayacut of 3035 Ha. Gross storage capacity of the reservoir estimated is 11.3 MCM and has a catchment area of 90.65 km2. Out of the gross storage capacity of 11.3 MCM, a minimum permissible storage of 1.0 MCM is fixed as dead storage. Meenkara reservoir is a multipurpose reservoir of which the Water stored  is mainly used for irrigation. A small part of storage is used for drinking water supply. Average rainfall is about 1200 m.m compared to the state average of 3000 m.m.

Water distribution for agriculture begins in the month of November and continues till March. Major crop cultivated in the ayacut region is paddy. 

Sluice is opening to a leading channel and from there diverted to LBC and RBC.  There are two spill ways and the spillway is opening to a leading channel and from there diverted to Meenkara river.

Reservoir
Catchment Area at dam site (km2)is 90.65 and Maximum Water Level (m) is 156.36 meters. Full reservoir Level (m) is 156.36 meters.

Location
Latitude	10°38'00"	
Longitude	76°48'00"

References

Dams in Kerala